Amandaville may refer to:

 Amandaville, Kentucky, an unincorporated community in Cumberland County
 Amandaville, West Virginia, an unincorporated community in Kanawha County